Easy Wonderful is the sixth studio album by the American alternative rock band Guster, released on October 5, 2010, on Universal Republic. From August 24 to October 18, 2010, videos for all of the tracks on the album were posted to Vimeo. The first single from the album, "Do You Love Me," was released on iTunes and through the band's website on August 3, 2010. It was the last album to feature Joe Pisapia, who left the band shortly before the album’s release.

Easy Wonderful peaked at #22 on the Billboard 200 and reached #2 on the Alternative Albums chart.

Reception

Easy Wonderful received positive reviews from critics. On Metacritic, the album holds a score of 81/100 based on 10 reviews, indicating "universal acclaim."

Track listing

Charts

References

External links
 Guster.com News

2010 albums
Guster albums
Aware Records albums
Universal Republic Records albums